Tzant were a British electronic music group, who had three top 40 singles between 1996 and 1998. Their debut "Hot and Wet (Believe It)", featuring Verna Francis, made number 36 on the UK Singles Chart during September 1996, and two further singles ("Sounds of Wickedness", their most successful single, and "Bounce with the Massive") would make the top 40 in 1998. Tzant's first two releases also found moderate success on the U.S. Hot Dance Club Play chart.

The group consisted of Jamie White, Marcus Thomas (a.k.a. ODC MC, formerly of Clock) and Moussa Clarke, who also released records under the names of Mirrorball, PF Project featuring Ewan McGregor and Musique vs U2. Later in 2008, Marcus Thomas co-penned Roebeck's underground hit "Just Wanna Be Loved", from the album Hurricanes on Venus, alongside composer Luke Corradine.

Discography

Tzant singles

PF Project singles

Mirrorball singles

Musique vs U2 singles

References

English electronic music groups
English dance music groups
British musical trios
Big beat groups
Breakbeat music groups
Musical groups from Nottingham